Condolences (from Latin con (with) + dolore (sorrow)) are an expression of sympathy to someone who is experiencing pain arising from death, deep mental anguish, or misfortune.

When individuals condole, or offer their condolences to a particular situation or person, they are offering active conscious support of that person or activity. This is often expressed by saying, "Sorry". Often, the English language expression "My condolences" will be in a context, such as of a friend's loved one, in which the one offering of condolences is communicating feelings of sympathy or empathy to that friend.

Condolence is not always expressed in sorrow or grievance, as it can also be used to acknowledge a fellow feeling or even a common opinion. There are various ways of expressing condolences to the victims. Examples include donating money to the charity nominated by the person who has just died, writing in a condolences book or supporting the friends and family of the loved one by making meals and looking after them in various ways in times of need.

A study from 2020 found that the specific words of condolence offered by doctors to grieving survivors can play a role in how those survivors fare in terms of  subsequent mental health outcomes.

References

External links 

 Condolence Message Examples Examples of condolence messages to say and write for every situation.

See also 
Consolation
Mourning
Thoughts and prayers

Counseling
Grief